The University of Toronto Students' Union (UTSU), legally known as the Students' Administrative Council of the University of Toronto, Inc., is the representative student government of full-time undergraduate students at the University of Toronto - St. George campus. It is Canada's second largest student union and the third largest in North America.

History
The student government evolved from the University of Toronto Union, which was founded in 1901, originally Kings College. This was replaced by the Parliament of the Undergraduates in 1907. The Parliament suffered from low attendance from its elected members, especially representatives of the medical school. As the years progressed its Executive shouldered much of the work. In 1913, the parliament was replaced by a Students' Administrative Council composed of solely male students. The Women's Students' Administrative Council was formed in 1916, and in 1919 the two councils formed a Joint Executive. In 1931 the separate councils were abolished and the Joint Executive became the main body, and during 1935-1936 the unwieldy name "Joint Executive Students' Administrative Council" was simplified to "Students' Administrative Council". At an annual general meeting on 16 November 2006, University of Toronto students voted to change the name to University of Toronto Students' Union.

The mandate of UTSU until 1971 can be found in section 34 of the University of Toronto Act, 1947. SAC's original offices were located in Hart House, before moving to the Louis B. Stewart Observatory at the centre of Hart House Circle, just south of the Hart House building itself. Presently, the UTSU's offices are located at the Student Commons at 230 College Street, which opened in 2021 as the union's new student centre.

Governance
The Union is governed by a Board of Directors which includes elected representatives from each of the schools' federated and constituent colleges and professional faculties. The number of directors from each division is proportional to the population of that college or faculty.

Much of the Board of Directors' responsibilities are delegated to committees: Equity and Accessibility, Campaigns and Outreach, Clubs, Elections and Referenda, Finance, Governance, Services, Student Aid, and the Executive Committee. The committees are made up of members of the Board of Directors, and deal with specific issues of operations, services, and campaigns. Committee work is then presented to the full Board of Directors for approval.

Full-time undergraduate students at the St. George campus can apply for UTSU funding for grassroots-based advocacy initiatives on campus, under the UTSU's Campus Initiatives Policy.

Federated structure
In April 2013, students of the Engineering Society (EngSoc), one of the UTSU federated bodies, voted to separate from UTSU following several years of tension between EngSoc and UTSU. After several years of negotiations, UTSU and EngSoc came to an agreement where UTSU recognised EngSoc as the main student government for engineering students, ensured that EngSoc would receive half of all UTSU levies and put EngSoc as the primary provider of student services to engineering students. EngSoc agreed not to defederate in return.

Elections
Voter turnout in UTSU elections has been very low for several years. Recently, turnouts began reaching as high as the 15% mark, but dropped back down to 6% following the controversy surrounding the 2010 elections.

The 2020 elections saw a voter turnout of 12.7%, a significant increase over the 4.2% turnout seen in the 2019 elections.

Services
The UTSU provides a variety of student services, including cheap in-office printing, the UTSU Food Bank, funding and resources for UTSU-recognized clubs, a Student Aid Program with bursaries covering transit, accessibility-related costs, textbook costs, and more. UTSU also administers a Health and Dental Plan that provides health and dental insurance to UTSU members.

Canadian Federation of Students affiliation 
In November 2002, UTSU members voted in favour of becoming members of the Canadian Federation of Students, with 65% of those who voted supporting this decision.

In 2016, a movement called You Decide UofT launched a petition to hold a referendum on CFS membership. A few months later, 4 out of the 7 UTSU executives endorsed the campaign and called for an end to UTSU membership of the CFS. In the 2017 UTSU elections, the Demand Better slate, which had a policy of leaving the CFS, won most of the executive positions, including the presidency.

Stances

Flat Fees

In 2009, the University of Toronto changed how they charged fees to students in the Faculty of Arts & Science. Instead of charging per-course fees, they started charging a flat fee – meaning that students would have to pay for five courses – even if they only took three. This amounted to a 66 per cent tuition fee increase for no service improvement.

The UTSU had been opposing the flat fee structure since it was announced in 2009. Since the implementation of the program, students have found it difficult to have a part-time job and do well in their studies, since they do not have the choice to reduce their course load under this tuition fee scheme. The flat fee scheme has also placed additional financial stresses onto students, worsening concerns about mental health.
They launched a strong campaign over the last few years to address this issue. In addition to petitions and protests, we garnered support from alumni, who started a letter-writing campaign to oppose flat fees, we brought the issue to a provincial level through the Canadian Federation of Students-Ontario, making it one of their main lobbying asks and educating students across the province to the unfair fee-collection model, some of whom did not know it was taking place at their school.

In 2013 the UTSU ramped up our campaign, collecting more than 6000 postcard petitions from students asking the government to address the issue of flat fees and delivering them to the Brad Duguid, Minister of Training, Colleges and Universities.
In December 2013, the provincial government announced that new legislation would limit the amount of fees that universities can charge to students. Under the new policy, 100 per cent of tuition fees can only be charged if students are taking an 80 per cent course load or higher. This will reduce tuition fees for some students over $2300 per year. The changes will roll out over two years starting in fall 2015.

Access copyright
UTSU was a vocal opponent of the University's controversial license with Access Copyright, which has since not been renewed. Access Copyright claimed that the license would provide students with the ability to use copyrighted works without penalty – a right already granted to students through the Copyright Act. Affirmed by the Supreme Court of Canada, students and researchers are permitted to use copyrighted works for educational purposes. Under the former license, each student at the University of Toronto was charged $26 in fees that provided no service or protections for students.

Other victories include: 
 Unpaid Interns’ Rights (2013)
 International Students – No Work Permits needed! (2013)
 Open Source Software (2013)
 Ancillary Fees (2013)
 Multi-Faith Space (2013)
 Bottled Water-Free Campus (2011)
 Student Access to Athletic Space (2011)
 Student Metropass (2009)
 National Grants (2008)
 Childcare at the University of Toronto Mississauga (2007)
 Tuition Fee Freeze (2004)
 Sweatshop-Free Campus (2000)
 Divestment from South African Apartheid (1990)
 Centre for Women & Trans People (1986)
 Hart House for Women (1972)
 Undergrad Access to Robarts (1972)

Criticisms and controversy
Historical criticisms

UTSU and its predecessor body SAC have long been the target of criticism. The earliest manifestations of this were in response to SAC's policy, established in 1926, of not interfering in political issues for fear this would impede campus unity. This policy extended to The Varsity (newspaper), which was published by SAC. In 1929 and 1931, SAC dismissed editors who published unpopular opinions. In the mid-1930s, SAC was criticized for failing to support efforts by anti-war and pro-peace advocates on campus, groups which SAC declared were of limited interest. In 1946, SAC's decision not to endorse efforts to prevent deportation of Japanese Canadians was also the brunt of campus criticism. Anti-racist advocates also derided SAC's inability to embrace this cause in the 1940s.

This criticism began to shift in the 1960s when the student council embarked on a more activist agenda.  One of the more concrete manifestations of this was in 1972, when the Medical Society held a successful referendum calling for their withdrawal from SAC.  Administrative hesitation was the only factor which prevented this withdrawal from becoming effective.

Controversial public positions

The UTSU has been criticized for having taken controversial public positions on equity and racial issues on campus, as well as having become involved in controversial campaigns relating to certain global issues like the Sri Lankan conflict or the Israeli-Palestinian conflict  and federal issues like the Aboriginal movement Idle No More. Many criticisms have come from members of provincial and federal political parties, including both the Liberals and Conservatives (and their student arms), which have questioned the legitimacy of UTSU's democratic credentials.

2007 CFS campaign allegations

The UTSU has also been criticized for its involvement with the Canadian Federation of Students, due to numerous reports of interference with student union elections at other schools in the Greater Toronto Area. Former S.A.C. Vice-President Sam Rahimi (2004-2005), has claimed that he was repeatedly asked to participate in election campaigns at Ryerson and York Universities, and that he and other student leaders from S.A.C. were bused in to these schools at election time to campaign on behalf of C.F.S. friendly slates  The Canadian Federation of Students denies these claims.

2008 threats of legal action

The UTSU has recently been involved in a number of scandals in which they have been accused of silencing students who disagree with the ideas of the union. In a recent referendum regarding the construction a Student Commons Building that was to be completely funded and run by students (as opposed to funded by private donations and run in part by the administration and by students ) the UTSU was accused of actively pursuing students who it felt were campaigning against the union. The then president of the union went so far as to threaten legal action against a student who was putting up posters questioning the UTSU's approach to the student commons.

2012 lecture protests

A protest in November 2012 against guest lecturer Warren Farrell at an event organized by the Canadian Association for Equality garnered criticism after an estimated fifteen protesters blocked the entrance to the event and caused a delay in the lecture. One person was arrested at the event but was released with no charges. The UTSU organized the protest after the university administration denied their request to cancel the lecture. The protest was organized in response to controversial excerpts from Warren Farrell's publications and statements he made about incest in a 1977 Penthouse interview.

One of the feminist protesters is recorded as repeatedly saying "You are fucking scum" to a male attendee.

2013 membership defederation

In 2013, several major divisions of the UTSU's membership—Trinity College, Victoria College, and the Engineering Society— held referendums proposing effective "defederation" from the Union by rerouting fees directly to their respective College or Faculty-based student societies, rather than paying the fees to the Union. All three divisions voted overwhelmingly in favour of fee diversion.

2015 election

After a long history of incumbent election victories, in 2015, a non-incumbent opposition slate won all 5 of the executive seats and a large number of the board.

Lawsuit against former executives and executive director

On September 24, 2015, it was revealed that the UTSU had filed a statement of claim against the former president, former vice-president internal & services and the former executive director regarding the dismissal of the former executive director. The lawsuit has since been settled between the former president and former vice-president internal & services.

See also
 List of Ontario students' associations

References

External links
 

University of Toronto
Ontario students' associations
Student government
Students' unions